The 2002 Portland Timbers season was the second season for the Portland Timbers—the third incarnation of a club to bear the Timbers name—of the now-defunct A-League, the second-tier soccer league of the United States and Canada at the time.

Preseason

Canterbury Cup

Regular season

May

June

July

August

September

Postseason

Competitions

A-League

Western Conference, Pacific Division standings

Point system: 4 points for a win; 1 point for a draw; 1 point for scoring 3 or more goals in a game; 0 points for a loss

Results by round

A-League Playoffs

Playoff bracket

First round

Club 
<div style="float:left; width:47%;">

Coaching staff

Top scorers
Players with 1 goal or more included only.

Disciplinary record 
Players with 1 card or more included only.

Goalkeeper stats 
All goalkeepers included.

Player movement

Transfers in

Loans in

Transfers out

Loans out

Notes
 Disciplinary record not available for September 7 playoff game vs. Vancouver Whitecaps.

References

2002 in Portland, Oregon
2002
American soccer clubs 2002 season
2002 in sports in Oregon